Chris Taylor (born May 22, 1962), also known by his monikers The Glove and ChrisGlove, is best known as a DJ and producer on the West Coast hip hop scene in the 1980s and 1990s. Taylor is known for his appearance in the film Breakin' alongside Ice-T. Taylor is credited on "Phone Tap" (Nas) as producer. Other production credits include "Reckless" (Ice T & Dave Storrs) "Tibetan Jam" (Chris "the Glove" Taylor) "Go Off" (Ice T & Dave Storrs) "Itchiban Scratch" (Chris "the Glove" Taylor.) Taylor claims to have produced "Stranded on Death Row" and "Doggy Dogg World" on the genre-defining albums The Chronic and Doggystyle, though he is not credited on either album and also claims to have written/produced the tracks for Xxplosive (Dr. Dre) and Hello (NWA) also uncredited.( Other sources name Taylor as an engineer, mixer and musician on The Chronic.

Career
Taylor began his career as a Los Angeles DJ. He appeared in the 1984 film Breakin and produced the song "Reckless" for its soundtrack. Taylor also has producer credits with the Firm, Phone Tap, Welcome to the Aftermath, Focus, and is the founding member of Po' Broke & Lonely?, an R&B act signed to Ruthless Records. He has been the music supervisor on BET reality series Tiny and Toya, Frankie & Neffie, Monica: Still Standing, Hell Date,  Played by Fame.

Current
Taylor is still producing music, most recently putting in work for the forthcoming album of Fatlip (of the Pharcyde) on the lead single, “Dust in the Wind”, featuring Krayzie Bone. The single, released February 18th, 2022, will make its way onto the album titled “Sccit & Siavash The Grouch Present… Fatlip - Torpor”.

References

External links
 
DJ Chris The Glove Interview NAMM Oral History Library (2020)

1962 births
Living people
American DJs
Record producers from California